Declan Kearney (born 19 December 1964) is an Irish Sinn Féin politician who was elected as a member (MLA) of the Northern Ireland Assembly to represent the South Antrim constituency at the 2016 election.

Originally from Antrim, he is the son of Oliver and Brigid (née Totten) Kearney. He lived in Derry at the time of his election.

Prior to his election, Kearney served as National Chairman of Sinn Féin, in which capacity he apologised "for all the lives lost during the Troubles". His brother, Ciarán Kearney, husband of Jane (née Donaldson), is the son-in-law of the late Provisional Irish Republican Army volunteer and Sinn Féin politician Denis Donaldson, who was assassinated near Glenties in County Donegal after having been exposed as a British agent.

References

1964 births
Irish republicans
Living people
Northern Ireland MLAs 2016–2017
Northern Ireland MLAs 2017–2022
People from County Antrim
Sinn Féin MLAs
Sinn Féin parliamentary candidates
Northern Ireland MLAs 2022–2027